Alexander Johnson Irwin (March 1, 1799June 14, 1847) was an American merchant and Wisconsin pioneer.  He represented Brown County in the Legislative Assembly of the Wisconsin Territory during the 1st and 2nd legislative assemblies.

Early life
Born in Greensburg, Pennsylvania, on March 1, 1799, Irwin moved with his family to Detroit, Michigan Territory, and then to Green Bay in 1823. Irwin and his brother Robert Irwin Jr. were in the mercantile business in Green Bay.  In 1827 he married Frances Pamelia Smith, with whom he had seven children.

Legislative career
In the first election after the creation of the Wisconsin Territory, in the Fall of 1836, Irwin was elected to the Territory's House of Representatives.  However, his opponent in the election, George McWilliams, challenged the results of the election.  Irwin was allowed to occupy the seat while a committee investigated the election challenge.  Ultimately, the committee found in favor of Irwin on questions of the vote count, but highlighted the issue that at the time of the election, Irwin was also serving as postmaster.  In the federal act which established the Wisconsin Territory, it was prohibited for an existing officeholder to be elected to the Legislative Assembly.  Therefore, the House voted in favor of McWilliams.

This same issue arose in Irwin's next election, in the Fall of 1837, when he was a candidate for the council.  In that election, Irwin's opponent, Joseph Dickinson, was declared the winner and took the seat.  Irwin challenged the result, pointing out that Dickinson—like Irwin in 1836—was an incumbent postmaster when elected to the council.  The Council agreed with Irwin's position, and voted to remove Dickinson and install Irwin.

Land office
In 1845, he was appointed receiver of the Green Bay Land Office. The position required trips on horseback to Saint Louis, Missouri, to deposit funds because there were no banks in Green Bay at the time. His extensive travel duties led to an infection in his arm, which resulted in his death. Irwin died in Green Bay in 1847 while still in office. Elisha Morrow was appointed receiver to fill the vacancy left by Irwin.

References

External links
 

1799 births
1847 deaths
People from Greensburg, Pennsylvania
Politicians from Detroit
Politicians from Green Bay, Wisconsin
Businesspeople from Wisconsin
Members of the Wisconsin Territorial Legislature
19th-century American politicians
19th-century American businesspeople